Adventure Club is a Canadian electronic dance music duo composed of Christian Srigley and Leighton James, based out of Montreal, Quebec. The duo began as a hardcore pop-punk band before venturing into electronic dance music in 2011. They are best known for their remixes of "Lullabies" by Yuna and "Crave You" from Flight Facilities. The duo's debut album Red // Blue was released on 2 December 2016.

History
The duo formed while attending high school in Montreal as a hardcore pop-punk band, but later decided to move on to electronic dance music after getting bored with the pop-punk sound and finding success with a dubstep remix of "Daisy" by American alternative-rock Brand New.
The remix climbed the charts on Hype Machine, a website that gathers popular songs from music blogs, which convinced them to make a change to producing EDM.

Some of the major influences to their sound include Tiësto, Flux Pavilion, Greeley Estates, Bring Me the Horizon and Skrillex. The duo's signature sound includes high-pitched female vocals with melodic sounds and heavy dubstep synths. Through online social network sites, the duo was able to increase their exposure by getting their first music video of "Everything to Me" by LIPS on the UKF Dubstep's YouTube channel. The remix was produced and directed by Cedric Sequerra of LuckyFish Productions.

The duo is signed under the management team of The Standard Group. Some of their signature sounds can also be credited to the program that they use to produce their music. Cakewalk SONAR is a less-commonly-used program in electronic dance music where FL Studio and Ableton Live are typically used. Some of the other equipment and software that they use include a Fireface console, Traktor Pro, Audio 6 and Kontrol X1.

The duo has toured across North America, as well as parts of Europe and Australia and have played at various music festivals including the 2015 American Electric Daisy Carnival in Las Vegas, Nevada. They also made their first appearance at the Ultra Music Festival 2013 in Miami.

The duo's remix of "Crave You" by Flight Facilities and Giselle Rosselli was featured in the episode "Restraint" (2012) of the MTV television series Teen Wolf.

The duo hosted a special volunteering event at the Los Angeles Regional Food Bank in April 2014. They invited fans to come out for a meet-n-greet and to help package food for the poor.

The duo's single "Rise and Fall (featuring Krewella)" was featured on the MTV television series Eye Candy.

The duo's single "Do I See Color" was featured on a 2012 Coca-Cola commercial with dancer Marquese Scott.

On 2 December 2016, Adventure Club released their debut album titled Red // Blue, containing lead single "Dreams" featuring ELEA and "Firestorm" with Sara Diamond.

Discography

Studio albums

Extended plays

Singles

Remixes

DJ Mixes

See also

 List of dubstep musicians
 List of Montreal music groups

References

External links
 
 Leonard, Aex (December 12, 2011).  "Adventure Club [Earmilk Exclusive + Interview]".  Earmilk.  Retrieved December 31, 2012.
 Goods, Flimsey (undated). "One To Watch: Adventure Club".  What's Really Good.  Retrieved December 31, 2012.
 Dubstep101 Interview.  Dubstep101.com.
 Deep, Johnny (February 1, 2012).  "Adventure Club".  Rolling Tuff.   Retrieved December 31, 2012.

Year of establishment missing
Canadian electronic music groups
Canadian musical duos
Dubstep musicians
Electronic music duos
Musical groups from Montreal